Patricia "Tricia" Duncan (born August 21, 1973) is a former swimmer for the U.S. Virgin Islands who participated in the backstroke at the 1988 Summer Olympics. Duncan finished 34th in the 100 m backstroke and 30th in 200 m backstroke. She is the older sister of NBA basketball player Tim Duncan. Duncan attended Swarthmore College.

References

People from Saint Croix, U.S. Virgin Islands
United States Virgin Islands female swimmers
Olympic swimmers of the United States Virgin Islands
Swimmers at the 1988 Summer Olympics
Place of birth missing (living people)
1973 births
Living people
Female backstroke swimmers
Swarthmore College alumni
21st-century American women